The Ming Shan Resort is a tourist attraction resort in Lugu Township, Nantou County, Taiwan. The resort houses the Xitou Monster Village.

See also
 List of tourist attractions in Taiwan

References

External links
 

Buildings and structures in Nantou County
Resorts in Taiwan
Tourist attractions in Nantou County